Khoibu may refer to:
 Khoibu people, an ethnic group of north-east India
 Khoibu language, the Sino-Tibetan language they speak

Language and nationality disambiguation pages